Khyber Mail was a daily newspaper published from Peshawar, Khyber-Pakhtunkhwa, Pakistan. The news service was discontinued in 1989, and the company provided print services. However it has now restarted in late 2020 and is undergoing test prints at the moment.

Sheikh Sanaullah was the founder editor of Khyber Mail, the first English newspaper of the then NWFP that he started from Peshawar in 1932. He was an eminent journalist who began his career as a sub-editor in daily 'Muslim Outlook", Lahore. He worked as a special correspondent of several Indian and foreign newspapers. He was an experienced newsman and was acknowledged far and wide when he successfully reported for the daily "Pioneer" Lucknow, the proceedings of the Court Martial of the Indian officers and jawans who had refused to fire on the unarmed people at the Qissa Khwani Bazar of Peshawar in 1930.

The newspaper survived till 1989, edited, published and managed by his sons Shiekh Zakaullah, Sheikh Inayat Ullah and Shiekh Saleemullah, mainly by the oldest, Shiekh Zakaullah, who himself was a distinguished journalist, a sportsman, a parliamentarian and a philanthropist. The news service died with the death of Shiekh Zakaullah in 1990.

Prominent among the editors of this unique news service were (now all deceased except Sabir Hussain) Shiekh Zakaullah, Qalandar Momand, Askar Ali Shah, Mr Mashwani, Ziauddin Ahmad and Sabir Hussain.

In 2020, the current owner Rizwan Inayat son of Sheikh Inayat Ullah and grandson of Sheikh Sana Ullah, has restarted the family heritage. The website is being updated daily and a hard copy and online copy is also printed daily now.

See also 
 List of newspapers in Pakistan

Reference

External links
  Khyber Mail Website (News Paper)
  Khyber Mail Website (Printing Press)
 

English-language newspapers published in Pakistan
Daily newspapers published in Pakistan
Publications with year of establishment missing
Mass media in Peshawar
Defunct newspapers published in Pakistan